The Declaration is the fifth studio album by American singer Ashanti, released on June 3, 2008, by The Inc. Records and Universal Motown Records.

The album includes the single "The Way That I Love You". Ashanti said during her June 2 appearance on the television program 106 & Park that she recorded fifty-two tracks for the album, of which fifteen—including the bonus tracks "Why" and "Hey Baby (After the Club)"—were used. This is her last album to be released on Irv Gotti's label The Inc. Records.

Singles
"The Way That I Love You" was referred to as the real "first single" in press material and media reports. It was released in February 2008 to Urban radio. It was released to digital retailers in March 2008 and to Rhythmic radio in April 2008. It reached number two on the Hot R&B/Hip-Hop Songs chart and number thirty-seven on the Billboard Hot 100, becoming Ashanti's first song to reach the top forty since "Only U" in 2004.
"Good Good" was released to urban radio stations on July 16, 2008. The song contains elements of Elton John's 1974 single "Bennie and the Jets", and has the same melody arrangement as Michael Jackson's "The Girl Is Mine".

Other Songs
In mid-2007, MTV News reported that the first single from The Declaration was "Switch", which was produced by Shy Carter and released digitally in the United States on July 24, 2007. It was later reported that "Switch" will not be included on the album's track listing, and that the first single would be "Hey Baby (After the Club)".
"Hey Baby (After the Club)", featuring Mario Winans, initially replaced "Switch" as the album's lead single. It samples Prince and The Revolution's 1984 single "Erotic City"; music reviewers criticized this decision as Sean Combs had already used this sample earlier that year for "Last Night". The song peaked at number eighty-seven on the Billboard Hot R&B/Hip-Hop Songs chart. "Hey Baby (After the Club)" was later replaced by "The Way That I Love You" as The Declaration's official lead single; it was not included on the US editions of the album, but was a bonus track for international releases.
"Body On Me" was recorded not only for Ashanti's The Declaration, but also for Nelly's fifth studio album Brass Knuckles. The track is produced by Akon and Giorgio Tuinfort. It went to number one on Billboard's Hot Videoclip Tracks chart in its first week, becoming the first number one single from Nelly's album.

Critical reception

The Declaration received generally mixed reviews from music critics. At Metacritic, which assigns a normalized rating out of 100 to reviews from mainstream critics, the album received an average score of 52, based on 11 reviews, indicating "mixed or average" reviews. Dan Gennoe of Yahoo! Music UK felt that the album was "surprisingly short of anything even approaching a commercial hit [but] even without instant hooks to grab on to, it's amazingly compelling." He called The Declaration a "supremely subtle and sophisticated record" as well as "the best album of Ashanti's career." Sal Cinquemani from Slant Magazine felt that while "past releases have displayed an ostensible desire to follow in the melodramatic steps of Mary J. Blige and much of Declaration continues in that quest," it also "aims to prove that Ashanti is indeed growing up."

AllMusic editor Andy Kellman found that "even though this album marks a nearly complete break from The Inc., it's very much in line with what came before it, hardly a major departure [...] This is neither a great nor a poor Ashanti album. It's decent, just like the rest of them." Leah Greenblatt from Entertainment Weekly wrote that The Declaration "simply doesn't make much of a statement, and its high point – the prettily emotive ballad "The Way That I Love You" – isn't enough to unseat the Beyoncés and Mary J.'s of the world." Rolling Stones Christian Hoard thought that Ashanti "is still doing the diva-by-numbers thing, alternating between angry-at-her-man anthems and lovey pleasantry [...] But even with A-list producers like Babyface, Jermaine Dupri and Rodney Jerkins, the beats stick to straightforward bounce or subdued ballads. And Ashanti doesn't offer any more personality."

Shanel Odum of Vibe gave a mixed review to the album, writing that "her voice is pleasant if sometimes uninspiring, but on soulful songs like "You’re Gonna Miss," the pain in her sweet-as-Smarties voice is definite. But even with all the emo-passion, nearly half of this album is lukewarm." Now writer Benjamin Boles found that it's "all too evident why The Declaration was delayed. Producer LT Hutton is behind most of these beats, and it’s easy to see why he hasn’t had a hit in years. A few bigger names drop in (Nelly and Akon might as well be sleepwalking here), but none sound like they’re putting much into their appearances. Ashanti’s still got a decent voice, but she’s badly in need of a better songwriting and production team." The Boston Globe remarked that "after four years away, Ashanti declares that she's back, but this middling, familiar set of songs is unlikely to reclaim her spotlight."

Chart performance
The Declaration debuted and peaked at number six on the US Billboard 200, selling 86,000 copies in its first week of release. It marked Ashanti's lowest opening sales for a regular studio album to then and was a considerable decline from her previous effort Concrete Rose, which had opened to sales of 254,000 units in 2004. On the Top R&B/Hip Hop Albums chart the album debuted at number two where it spent a total of 34 consecutive weeks on the chart. By October 2008, The Declaration had sold 246,000 copies.

Track listing 

Notes
 denotes co-producer
 denotes executive producer

Credits and personnel
Credits are taken from the album's liner notes.

Seven Aurelius – producer, vocals (background)
Chad Beat – producer, programming, vocals (background)
Keith Bizz – producer, programming
Paul Boutin – engineer, mixing
Sandy Brummels – art direction, creative director
Channel 7 – engineer, Instrumentation, producer, vocals (background)
Mike Donaldson – engineer
Jermaine Dupri – producer
Kenneth Edmonds – composer, drums, guitar, keyboards, producer
Theron Feemster – producer
Mark "Exit" Goodchild – engineer
John Horesco IV – engineer
Bob Horn – engineer
L.T. Hutton – composer
Rodney "Darkchild" Jerkins  – producer
Khris Kellow – keyboards
Christopher Kornmann – art direction, design
Sam Lobue II – engineer
Mario Lucy – engineer
John Marie – mixing
Nelly – primary artist
Eddy C. Richardson – a&R
Andros Rodriguez – engineer
Matthew Rolston – photography
Gillian Russell – A&R
Manuel Seal, Jr. – producer
Peter Stengaard –  engineer, instruments, producer, programming
Aliaume Thiam – Instrumentation, producer, programming
Diane Warren – executive producer
James M. Wisner – engineer

Charts

Weekly charts

Year-end charts

Release history

References

2008 albums
Albums produced by Akon
Albums produced by Jermaine Dupri
Albums produced by L.T. Hutton
Albums produced by Rodney Jerkins
Albums produced by Theron Feemster
Ashanti (singer) albums
Universal Motown Records albums